Blood is a biological fluid found in animals.

Blood may also refer to:

Places
 Blood Falls, a geological feature at the Taylor Glacier in Antarctica
 Blood Mountain, Georgia, United States
 Blood River, KwaZulu-Natal, South Africa

People
 Blood (surname), various people with the last name
 Black Blood, later stage name for American professional wrestler Billy Jack Haynes (born 1953)
 Johnny "Blood" McNally (1903–1985), American football player
 James Blood Ulmer (born 1942), also known as "Blood" Ulmer, an American jazz and blues guitarist and singer

Arts, entertainment, and media

Fictional entities
 Blood (Transformers), a character from the Transformers universe
 Blood, the name of the dog in A Boy and His Dog
 Baron Blood, several Marvel Comics characters
 Brother Blood, two comic book characters in the DC Universe

Film
 Blood (2000 film), a British horror film starring Adrian Rawlins
 Blood (2004 film), a Canadian drama film directed by Jerry Ciccoritti
 Blood (2008 film), a Bengali film
 Blood (2009 film), a Japanese supernatural action film
 Blood (2012 film), a British thriller
 The Blood (film), a 1922 German silent film directed by Paul Legband
 Blood: The Last Vampire, a 2000 anime film
 Blood: The Last Vampire (2009 film), a live-action version of the anime film Blood: The Last Vampire
 Blood (2023 film), an American thriller film

Literature
 Blood (Birch novel), a novel by Australian author Tony Birch
 Blood (Shillitoe novel), a 2002 novel by Tony Shillitoe
 Blood, an autobiography by Jack Youngblood
 Blood: A Southern Fantasy, a novel by Michael Moorcock
 Blood: A Tale, a comic book mini-series written by J. M. DeMatteis
 Bloods: An Oral History of the Vietnam War by Black Veterans, a 1984 book by Wallace Terry

Music

Albums
 Blood (Pulled Apart by Horses album), a 2014 album by the band Pulled Apart by Horses
 Blood (EP), a 2003 album by Polish band Vader
 Blood (Franz Ferdinand album), 2009 album by the Scottish band Franz Ferdinand
 Blood (Juliana Hatfield album), 2021 album by American musician Juliana Hatfield
 Blood (In This Moment album), 2012 album by American band In This Moment
 Blood (Lianne La Havas album), 2015 album by Lianne La Havas
 Blood (The Microphones album), 2001 album by The Microphones
 Blood (OSI album), 2009 album by the band OSI
 Blood (Project Pitchfork album), 2014 album by Project Pitchfork
 Blood (Rhye album), 2018 album by Rhye
 Blood (Stan Ridgway and Pietra Wexstun album), 2003 album by Stan Ridgway and Pietra Wexstun
 Blood (This Mortal Coil album), 1991 album by This Mortal Coil
 The Blood (album), 2007 album by Christian music artist Kevin Max

Groups
 Blood (band), a Japanese gothic rock band
 Blood, a production duo composed of Jerome Fontamillas and Jyro Xhan
 The Blood, a British punk band

Songs
 "Blood" (Editors song), a 2005 song by the British indie rock band Editors
 "Blood" (Kendrick Lamar song), a 2017 song by American rapper Kendrick Lamar
 “Blood” (Pearl Jam song), a 1993 song by the American band Pearl Jam
 "Blood" (In This Moment song), a 2012 song by the American band In This Moment
 “Blood” (My Chemical Romance song), a 2006 song by the rock quintet My Chemical Romance
 "Blood", a song by Algiers from the album Algiers
 “Blood”, a song by Anthrax from the album Persistence of Time
 "Blood", a song by Breaking Benjamin from the album Ember
 “Blood”, a song by Candiria from the album What Doesn't Kill You...
 “Blood”, a song by Coheed and Cambria from the album Vaxis – Act II: A Window of the Waking Mind
 “Blood”, a song by Faster Pussycat from the album Between the Valley of the Ultra Pussy
 “Blood”, a song by Faith No More from Introduce Yourself
 "Blood", a song by Loop from the album A Gilded Eternity
 “Blood”, a song by Pestilence from the album Testimony of the Ancients
 “Blood”, a song by Priestess from the album Hello Master
 “Blood”, a song by Queensrÿche from the album Tribe
 "Blood", a song by Sonata Arctica from the album Pariah's Child
 “Blood”, a song by Tindersticks from their 1993 self-titled debut album
 “Blood”, a song by Triple J band The Middle East from the EP The Recordings of the Middle East

Television

Series
 Blood+, a 2006 anime television series based on the movie Blood: The Last Vampire
 Blood-C, a 2011 anime television series based on the movie Blood: The Last Vampire
 Blood (South Korean TV series), a 2015 South Korean television series
 Blood (2018 TV series), an Irish psychological thriller
 Bloods (TV series), a 2021 comedy series

Episodes
 "Blood" (The X-Files), a 1994 episode of the American television series The X-Files
 "Blood", an episode of The Protector
 "The Blood" (Seinfeld), a 1997 episode of the American television situation comedy Seinfeld

Other uses in arts, entertainment, and media
 Blood (journal), a medical hematology journal
 Blood (video game), a 1997 first-person shooter video game
 "Blood", a season 3 episode of Theme Time Radio Hour
 Blood, another name for penny dreadful literature

Sports
 "Bloods", formerly nickname for the Sydney Swans (South Melbourne Football Club)
 "Bloods", a nickname for the West Adelaide Football Club

Other uses
 Blood (automobile), a car manufactured in the United States from 1902 to 1905
 Blood Tribe, or Kainai Nation, a Native American tribe in Alberta, Canada
 Bloods, a street gang founded in Los Angeles, California

See also
 
 
 Bloody (disambiguation)
 Blud, a fairy in Slavic mythology
 Major Bludd, a fictional character from the G.I. Joe: A Real American Hero franchise